Konaklar is a village in Tarsus  district of Mersin Province, Turkey. At    it is situated in Çukurova (Cilicia of the antiquity) plains to the south of Turkish state highway  . The population of Konaklar was 321  as of 2012. Main economic activity is agriculture. Cotton, wheat and various vegetables are produced.

References

Villages in Tarsus District